The 2007–08 San Antonio Spurs season was the 41st season of the franchise, 35th in San Antonio, and 32nd in the National Basketball Association (NBA). The Spurs were the defending NBA champions after winning their fourth title, having swept the Cleveland Cavaliers in four games. They would once again win at least 50 games for the 9th straight season, and make the playoffs for the 11th straight season. After beating the Phoenix Suns in 5 games and the New Orleans Hornets in 7, the Spurs were eliminated by the Los Angeles Lakers in the Western Conference Finals. The Lakers would go on to lose to the Boston Celtics in the NBA Finals in six games. They failed to gain back-to-back titles for the fourth time in nine years.

Following the season, Robert Horry retired after winning seven championships.

Offseason

Draft picks
San Antonio's selections from the 2007 NBA draft in New York City.

Roster

Regular season

Standings

Record vs. opponents

Game log

October
Record: 2–0; Home: 1–0; Road: 1–0

November
Record: 12–3; Home: 8–0; Road: 4–3

December
Record: 7–5; Home: 7–2; Road: 0–3

January
Record: 8–8; Home: 4–3; Road: 4–5

February
Record: 10–1; Home: 4–0; Road: 6–1

March
Record: 12–6; Home: 7–1; Road: 5–5

April
Record: 5–3; Home: 3–1; Road: 2–2

Green background indicates win.
Red background indicates loss.

Playoffs

|- bgcolor="bbffbb"
| 1 || April 19 ||  Phoenix || 117–115 (2OT) || Duncan (40) || Duncan (15) || Duncan, Ginóbili, Parker (5) ||AT&T Center18,797 || 1–0
|- bgcolor="bbffbb"
| 2 || April 22 ||  Phoenix || 102–96 || Parker (32) || Duncan (17) || Parker (7) ||AT&T Center18,797 || 2–0
|- bgcolor="bbffbb"
| 3 || April 25 || @ Phoenix || 115–99 || Parker (41) || Duncan (10) || Parker (12) ||US Airways Center18,422 || 3–0
|- bgcolor="edbebf"
| 4 || April 27 || @ Phoenix || 86–105 || Parker (18) || Duncan (10) || Parker (3) ||US Airways Center18,422 || 3–1
|- bgcolor="bbffbb"
| 5 || April 29 ||  Phoenix || 92–87 || Parker (31) || Duncan (17) || Parker (8) ||AT&T Center18,797 || 4–1
|-

|- bgcolor="edbebf"
| 1 || May 3 || @ New Orleans || 82–101 || Parker (23) || Ginóbili, Oberto (6) || Ginóbili (7) || New Orleans Arena18,040 || 0–1
|- bgcolor="edbebf"
| 2 || May 5 || @ New Orleans || 84–102 || Duncan (18) || Duncan (8) || Ginóbili (7) || New Orleans Arena17,927 || 0–2
|- bgcolor="bbffbb"
| 3 || May 8 ||  New Orleans || 110–99 || Ginóbili, Parker (31) || Duncan (13) || Parker (11) || AT&T Center18,797 || 1–2
|- bgcolor="bbffbb"
| 4 || May 11 ||  New Orleans || 100–80 || Duncan (22) || Duncan (15) || Ginóbili, Parker (8) || AT&T Center18,797 || 2–2
|- bgcolor="edbebf"
| 5 || May 13 || @ New Orleans || 79–101 || Ginóbili (20) || Duncan (23) || Ginóbili (7) || New Orleans Arena18,246 || 2–3
|- bgcolor="bbffbb"
| 6 || May 15 ||  New Orleans || 99–80 || Ginóbili (25) || Duncan (15) || Duncan (6) || AT&T Center18,797 || 3–3
|- bgcolor="bbffbb"
| 7 || May 19 || @ New Orleans || 91–82 || Ginóbili (26) || Duncan (14) || Ginóbili, Parker (5) || New Orleans Arena18,235 || 4–3
|-

|- bgcolor="edbebf"
| 1 || May 21 || @ L.A. Lakers || 85–89 || Duncan (30) || Duncan (18) || Parker (6) || Staples Center18,997 || 0–1
|- bgcolor="edbebf"
| 2 || May 23 || @ L.A. Lakers || 71–101 || Parker (13) || Duncan (16) || Duncan (4) || Staples Center18,997 || 0–2
|- bgcolor="bbffbb"
| 3 || May 25 || L.A. Lakers || 103–84 || Ginóbili (30) || Duncan (21) || Duncan, Parker (5) || AT&T Center18,797 || 1–2
|- bgcolor="edbebf"
| 4 || May 27 || L.A. Lakers || 91–93 || Duncan (29) || Duncan (17) || Parker (9) || AT&T Center18,797 || 1–3
|- bgcolor="edbebf"
| 5 || May 29 || @ L.A. Lakers || 92–100 || Parker (23) || Duncan (15) || Duncan (10) || Staples Center18,997 || 1–4
|-

Player stats

Regular season 

*Total for entire season including previous team(s)

Playoffs

Awards, records and milestones

Awards
Tim Duncan, All-NBA Second Team
Manu Ginóbili, All-NBA Third Team
Tim Duncan, NBA All-Defensive First Team
Bruce Bowen, NBA All-Defensive First Team
Tony Parker was named the Western Conference Player of the Week for games played from November 19 through November 25.
Head coach Gregg Popovich was named the Western Conference Coach of the Month for games played in October and November.
Manu Ginóbili was named the Western Conference Player of the Week for games played from February 19 through February 24.

Records

Milestones

Transactions 
The Spurs were involved in the following transactions during the 2007–08 season.

Trades

Free agents

See also
2007–08 NBA season

References

San Antonio Spurs seasons
2007–08 NBA season by team
San Antonio
San Antonio